Saint-Ouen is a station on Line 14 of the Paris Métro, located at the limits of the territories of the communes of Saint-Ouen-sur-Seine and Clichy. The station was opened by the RATP as the 304th station of the metro on 14 December 2020. The construction of the metro station permitted connections with the RER C at Saint-Ouen station.

Gallery

References 

Accessible Paris Métro stations
Paris Métro stations in Saint-Ouen, Seine-Saint-Denis
Railway stations in France opened in 2020